Alucita montigena is a moth of the family Alucitidae. It was described by Thomas Bainbrigge Fletcher in 1910 and is found in Sri Lanka.

References

Moths described in 1910
Alucitidae
Moths of Sri Lanka